Quesnellia, or the Quesnel terrane, is a terrane in British Columbia, Canada; constituent of the Canadian Cordillera. It formed  volcanic arc during the Mesozoic era, in the Triassic and Jurassic periods.

The Quesnel terrane forms part of the Intermontane superterrane along with the Stikinia and Cache Creek terranes.

Quesnellia contains numerous deposits of alkalic Copper‐Gold porphyry.

See also

References

Geology of British Columbia
Mesozoic volcanism
Terranes